Catur sloka is a Sanskrit term, referring to the four most important verses from a scripture, usually Bhagavad-gita or Bhagavata Purana spoken directly by Svayam bhagavan and considered by some Śruti.

See also
Sanskrit grammar

References

Hindu philosophical concepts